The Monument to the Liberators of Soviet Latvia and Riga from the German Fascist Invaders, unofficially known simply as the Victory Monument, was a memorial complex in Victory Park, Pārdaugava, Riga, Latvia, erected in 1985 to commemorate the Red Army soldiers that recaptured Riga and the rest of Latvia from Nazi Germany at the end of World War II (1944–1945). The complex consisted of a 79-metre tall obelisk that consisted of five columns topped by five-pointed star, and two groups of sculptures – Homeland the Mother and a band of three soldiers.

The monument was the subject of long-standing controversy in modern Latvian society, concerning the historical memory of World War II and the legacy of Soviet rule. Many ethnic Latvians regarded it not as a symbol of liberation, but rather the Soviet re-occupation. The monument's obelisk was sometimes referred to in Latvian as "Moscow's Finger" (Maskavas pirksts) or okupeklis (a portmanteau of okupācija – 'occupation' and piemineklis – 'monument'),  and juxtaposed to the Freedom Monument.

Following the 2022 Russian invasion of Ukraine, a decision was made to finally remove the monument. The demolition began 22 August 2022 and on 25 August 2022, the obelisk was toppled.

History

Construction and early years
In 1994, after the restoration of Latvia's independence, the Socialist Party of Latvia took initiatives to revive Victory Day celebrations at the monument. the following year, around 11,000 people gathered for a 9 May event chaired by the vice-chairman of Socialist Party and MP .

In 1997, the monument was unsuccessfully bombed by members of the Latvian ultranationalist group Pērkonkrusts, two of whom died during the bombing, while six others, including Igors Šiškins, were eventually sentenced to up to three years in prison in 2000. In 1998, the Victory Day celebration at the monument was organized by the party For Human Rights in a United Latvia for the first time and by 2005 the event had grown to resemble an open-air festival attended by around 260,000 people.

Calls for removal
In 2007, the Popular Front of Latvia and the Alliance of Latvian World War II Veterans sent an open letter to Prime Minister of Latvia Aigars Kalvītis urging him to prevent "any provocations that might discredit the Latvian state" and resolve any issues in regard to the monument's removal as it is "glorifying the ideals of a regime guilty of genocide that killed about 60 million people, including thousands of Latvians."

After the relocation of the Bronze Soldier in Tallinn in late April 2007, the issue of the monument was brought up again. Chairman of the nationalist All for Latvia! party Raivis Dzintars called on Riga Mayor Jānis Birks of the conservative TB/LNNK to organize a public discussion on the future of the monument, but Birks dismissed the calls as "very thoughtless and even harmful to Latvia". The chairman of the Union of Greens and Farmers parliamentary faction  and the leader of Latvia's First Party/Latvian Way parliamentary faction Andris Bērziņš were similarly dismissive.

Popular petitions for and against removal

In 2013, more than 11,000 signatures were collected on the online petition website ManaBalss.lv supporting removal of the monument and reconstruction of Victory Square the way it was originally planned in the 1930s, before the Soviet occupation, commemorating the victory in 1919 over the West Russian Volunteer Army of Pavel Bermondt-Avalov during the Latvian War of Independence. Justice Minister of Latvia Jānis Bordāns was among the supporters of the initiative, whereas Russian Foreign Ministry representative Alexander Lukashevich condemned the calls for the monument's removal.

On 29 June 2016, the Saeima Mandate, Ethics and Submissions Committee rejected the petition based on the argumentation of the Riga City Council that the location had already been developed and the Ministry of Foreign Affairs of Latvia that concluded that the monument was protected by a Latvian-Russian 1994 agreement on preservation and maintenance of memorials and burial sites.

In 2019, a similar petition by the same initiator gathered more than 10,000 signatures and on 2 April the Saeima Mandate, Ethics and Submissions Committee began discussing it, with some members supporting the removal, some opposing it and some offering alternative solutions, such as renaming the monument and building an interactive museum of occupation under it. At the same time, a counterinitiative by the Latvian Russian Union leader Tatjana Ždanoka on "the protection of monuments against Nazism", including the Monument to the Liberators of Soviet Latvia and Riga from the German Fascist Invaders, had gathered over 21,000 signatures.

Removal
In April 2022, following the Russian invasion of Ukraine, a 2013 social media post by the Latvian Russian Union council member Jevgēņijs Osipovs was shared by him and other members and supporters of the party, in which he threatened with "war" if the monument was moved "by even a millimetre". 

On 11 April, the monument complex was declared unsafe by the Riga City Council and fenced off. A few weeks later, a representative of the 4 May Declaration Club uniting pro-independence members of the Supreme Council of Latvia, said that the "ghost symbolizing occupation, aggression, and russkij sovetskij mir [Russian Soviet world]" "should be removed at the earliest opportunity". 

On 6 May, Latvian Prime Minister Krišjānis Kariņš announced that the monument's eventual removal was inevitable. After a spontaneous pro-Russian rally at the monument on 10 May, access to it was restricted once again and extended until August 31, while three police officers present on site on 10 May were suspended from their duties. On 12 May, a public demolition fundraising campaign was launched and more than 39,000 euros were donated by the end of the day when the Saeima voted to suspend the functioning of a section of an agreement between Latvia and Russia regarding the preservation of memorial structures. 

The next day Riga City Council also voted in favour of the monument's removal, but the total amount of donations reached almost 200,000 euros. Russia submitted a request for compensation for the monument's removal, but was dismissed by Minister of Foreign Affairs of Latvia Edgars Rinkēvičs who made a reference to Vladimir Putin's 2004 response to Latvia's wish to recover its former territory Abrene by saying that Russia "will get a dead donkey ears, not a compensation".

On 20 May, a rally called "Getting Rid of Soviet Heritage" took place in Riga and was attended by approximately 5,000 people who walked from Freedom Monument to the so-called Victory Monument, while a counter rally by Latvian Russian Union with a reverse route was not allowed over security concerns. According to a June 2022 survey, 49% of people supported the dismantling of the monument (72% ethnic Latvians and only 9% ethnic Russians), while 25% didn’t support it (76% ethnic Russians and only 10% ethnic Latvians).

On 22 August 2022, the monument's removal began with landscape preparations and State Security Service monitoring the situation for potential provocations. Seven people were detained by the police the same day and an additional 14 people a day later. The band of three soldiers was demolished on 23 August, and the monument's main element, the obelisk, was toppled on 25 August. The following day, UN Human Rights Committee belatedly asked Latvia to stop the removal of the monument and preserve the already removed parts of the monument while it reviewed a complaint submitted to the committee on 24 August. On 29 August, the pool within the memorial complex was drained, and a tonne of fish, mostly carp, were removed. The removal of the sculptures and the debris from the site was officially completed on 14 October, while the removal of the memorial complex's foundation and remaining structures was scheduled to be completed by the end of the month. A skatepark is planned to be built on the site of the monument as a potential temporary solution.

Russia's response
The Investigative Committee of Russia immediately launched a criminal case over the monument's removal.

On 10 November 2022, the Ministry of Foreign Affairs of Russia summoned the Latvian ambassador Māris Riekstiņš in protest at the removal of Soviet monuments and threatened with the "right to retaliate, including by taking asymmetric steps". Rinkēvičs commented by saying that, "Any step they take will be followed by an adequate, stern, and solid response."

Notes

References

External links

1985 establishments in Latvia
2022 disestablishments in Latvia
Cultural infrastructure completed in 1985
History of Riga
Monuments and memorials in Riga
Obelisks
Removed monuments and memorials
Soviet military memorials and cemeteries
Victory monuments
Destroyed sculptures